Katon-Karagay National Park (Katonqarağai memlekettık ūlttyq tabiği parkı) is the largest national park in Kazakhstan, located on the eastern edge of the country, in the Southern Altai Mountains. The park fills the west side of the "X" where the borders of Kazakhstan, Russia, China, and Mongolia meet. The highest peak in Siberia (Belukha Mountain), is on the Russian border in the Katun Range.

Created on June 1, 2001, the park was included in the transnational park "Altai" with Russia in 2011.  In 2014, the park was included in the new "Katon-Karagay Biosphere Reserve", named by the UNESCO Man-and-Biosphere program.

Topography
The park is bordered on the north by the Altai Republic of Russia, on the southeast by China, on the west by the Farpusnaya River, and on the south by the northern slopes of the Sarymsakty and Tarbagatai ranges of the Southern Altai Mountains.  34% of the park is forested, the remainder being mountain meadows or rocky slopes and glaciers. The slopes are steep, with terrain formed by the glaciers: trough-shaped valleys, cirques, and moraines. The glacier-fed rivers are steep and energetic. Kokkol Falls, at 80 meters, is the largest waterfall in the Altai Mountains.

Ecoregion
The park is in the Altai alpine meadow and tundra and Altai steppe and semi-desert ecoregions.  These ecoregions are exhibit the complete altitudinal vegetation zones from steppe to alpine tundra.  These ecoregions exhibit very high diversity because they are at the biogeographic divide between Siberia to the north and the cold deserts of Central Asia to the south.

Climate
The climate at mid-level altitudes is "Humid continental climate, cool summer subtype" (Koeppen Classification Dfb, with alpine climate (Koppen ET) above the treeline. Precipitation patterns are affected by the mountainous terrain and altitude zoning; lower elevations average 386 mm of precipitation per year (maximum in summer).

Plants and Animals
The vegetation is arrayed in four general altitude zones.  
 The nival zone, at elevations of 2,800 meters and above, supports small communities of lichen and alpine vegetation such as Snow Primrose and Altai Buttercup in the crevices and rocky edges of snowfields and glaciers.  
 The Tundra-mountain belt extends from 2,100 meters to 2,800 meters.  It features mosses and lichens on the stones, shrubs and grassy tundra, including Altai bluegrass and Honeysuckle.
 The Sub-alpine forest and mountain meadow zone extends from 1,200 to 2,300 meters.  The most common trees are Siberian pine, larch, and birch.  The meadows feature grasses, sedges, and blueberries.
 The Mountain-forest, meadow-steppe zone is found below 1,200 meters. At this level are birch and larch-aspen forest, and widespread grasses and bushes.

Scientists have recorded 363 species of vertebrates in the park: 284 birds, 65 mammals, 6 reptiles, 2 amphibians, and 6 species of fish.  Common mammals include the common and tundra shrew, wolf, fox, roe deer and brown bear.

In January 2021, a camera trap in the Katon-Karagay National Park captured video of a rare snow leopard (Panthera uncia) in the Altai mountains.

Tourism
There are visitor accommodations in the nearby settlements. 24% of the park (1,512 km2) is zoned as a strict nature reserve, the other 76% (4,922 km2) is zoned for recreation, scientific study, and restricted economic activity.

References

External links
 Topographic map of the area

National parks of Kazakhstan
East Kazakhstan Region